The battle of al-Shihr was a military confrontation in 1548 between the Portuguese alongside Sa'd bin Afrar the ruler of Mahra Sultanate and Kathiri Sultanate who had captured the al-Mahrah from Sa'd The Portuguese successfully captured the fort near al-Shihr from the Kathiris.

Background
In early 1548, the city of Aden rose in rebellion against Ottoman rule and the local inhabitants dispatched envoys to Portuguese Goa, offering to become vassals of the King of Portugal and allowing them to install a garrison in the city in exchange for protection against the Turks. The Governor of India Dom João de Castro dispatched his son Dom Álvaro de Castro ahead of a force of 22 light galleys and 200 soldiers to Aden in January 1548. Dom Álvaro anchored with his party by an archipelago on the Arabian coast identified as "Canacarim", where he met Dom Paio de Noronha ahead of a small party of three light galleys, and who informed Dom Álvaro that the Turks had already retaken the city. Dom Álvaro, therefore, decided to take his flotilla to Xael (al-Shihr) and expunge the fort near al-Shihr, which was captured by the Kathiri Sultan Badr

The siege
Upon arriving at Xael, the Portuguese disembarked unimpeded. The ruler of Al Mahra Sa'd bin Afrar and his brother asked the Portuguese for aid because the Kathiri sultan Badr captured Mahrah country, Qishn, and its provinces, The Kathiris raised a white flag, then a red one, and opened fire on the Portuguese. Dom Álvaro had it bombarded, albeit with meager results, as he lacked heavy artillery and around 40 Portuguese killed. Sometime later two large galliots arrived with siege guns, with which the Portuguese were able to batter the walls of the fort heavily, and within a short, the garrison sent Sulaimân bin Sa'd bin Sulaimân al-Muhammadï who sought to surrender in exchange for freedom, The fort was stormed on April 7 and the Kathiri garrison was entirely slaughtered. and the fort delivered to the Afrar brothers. and Sulaimân bin Sa'd was taken prisoner to Goa.

Dom Álvaro was back in Goa by May 4.

See also
 Battle of al-Shihr (1531)

References

Bibliography
Luís de Albuquerque: Diário da Viagem de D. Álvaro de Castro ao Hadramaute em 1548, in Revista da Universidade de Coimbra, Coimbra, 1972.

Sieges involving Portugal
16th century in Portuguese India
Conflicts in 1548